Leonel Suárez Fajardo (born September 1, 1987) is a decathlete from Cuba. He was bronze medalist in the event at the 2012 Summer Olympics, 2008 Summer Olympics and silver medalist at the 2009 World Championships. He won a third consecutive global medal at the 2011 World Championships in Athletics, taking bronze.

He was born in Santiago de Cuba. His personal best for the decathlon is 8654 points (which set in Havana, winning the 2009 Central American and Caribbean Championships).

Career
Suárez was fourth at the 2007 Pan American Games. In 2008, he was also fourth at Hypo-Meeting (setting a national record of 8366 pts) and finished as runner-up in the IAAF World Combined Events Challenge that year. He scored a gold medal at the 2009 Central American and Caribbean Championships in Athletics.

He competed at the 2010 IAAF World Indoor Championships, but only managed seventh place. In the outdoor season, he was runner-up at the 2010 Multistars meeting in Desenzano del Garda, finishing with 8112 points behind American Jake Arnold. He was third at the Hypo-Meeting at the end of May, but he reached the top of the podium at the Décastar competition in Talence with a total of 8328 points.

At the 2011 Hypo Meeting he threw a meeting record of 75.49 m in the javelin, although his final score of 8440 points for second place was some distance behind the winner Trey Hardee. After a modest start at the 2011 TNT - Fortuna Meeting, he began the second day in ninth place but he pulled himself back into contention and, helped by a pole vault best of 5.00 m, he took the men's title with a total of 8231 points. At the 2011 World Championships in Athletics in August, Suárez won the bronze medal in decathlon with a final points tally of 8501. Although he had not won all of is outings, his consistent high scores over the three meetings earned him the IAAF Combined Events Challenge title that year.

Personal best
Decathlon: 8654 pts – Havana, 4 July 2009

International competitions

References

External links 

 
 
 Tilastopaja biography
 Leonel Suárez in EcuRed, the official Cuban online encyclopedia (Spanish)

1987 births
Living people
Sportspeople from Santiago de Cuba
Cuban decathletes
Cuban male athletes
Olympic athletes of Cuba
Olympic bronze medalists for Cuba
Athletes (track and field) at the 2008 Summer Olympics
Athletes (track and field) at the 2012 Summer Olympics
Athletes (track and field) at the 2016 Summer Olympics
Medalists at the 2008 Summer Olympics
Medalists at the 2012 Summer Olympics
Pan American Games gold medalists for Cuba
Pan American Games medalists in athletics (track and field)
Athletes (track and field) at the 2007 Pan American Games
Athletes (track and field) at the 2011 Pan American Games
Athletes (track and field) at the 2019 Pan American Games
World Athletics Championships athletes for Cuba
World Athletics Championships medalists
Olympic bronze medalists in athletics (track and field)
Central American and Caribbean Games gold medalists for Cuba
Competitors at the 2018 Central American and Caribbean Games
Central American and Caribbean Games medalists in athletics
Medalists at the 2011 Pan American Games
21st-century Cuban people